{{DISPLAYTITLE:C8H8}}
The molecular formula C8H8 may refer to:

 Barrelene
 Benzocyclobutene (BCB)
 Cubane
 Cuneane
 Cyclooctatetraene
 Semibullvalene
 Polystyrene
 Styrene
 Xylylene
 Heptafulvene

List_of_compounds_with_carbon_number_8